The 2019 Danmark Rundt (officially PostNord Danmark Rundt 2019 for sponsorship reasons) is a men's road bicycle race which was held from 21 August to 25 August 2019. It was the 29th edition of Danmark Rundt, which was established in 1985. The race was rated as a 2.HC event and formed part of the 2019 UCI Europe Tour. The race was made up of five stages over five days and includes an individual time trial.

Teams
A total of 20 teams with 6 riders each race in the 2019 Danmark Rundt: 3 UCI WorldTeams, 10 UCI Professional Continental teams, 6 UCI Continental Teams along with a Danish national team under the Team Postnord Danmark name. PostNord is the name sponsor of the race.

UCI WorldTeams

 
 
 

UCI Professional Continental Teams

 
 
 
 
 
 
 
 
 
 

UCI Continental Teams

 
 
 
 
 
 

National Teams
 Team PostNord Danmark

Schedule
There are five stages over five days with an individual time trial on day two.

Stages

Stage 1
21 August 2019 – Silkeborg to Silkeborg,

Stage 2
22 August 2019 – Grindsted, individual time trial (ITT)

Stage 3
23 August 2019 – Holstebro to Vejle,

Stage 4
24 August 2019 – Korsør to Asnæs Indelukke,

Stage 5
25 August 2019 – Roskilde to Frederiksberg,

Classification leadership

Final classification standings

General classification

Points classification

Mountains classification

Young rider classification

Active rider classification

Teams classification

References

External links
 Official site (Danish)

Danmark Rundt
Danmark Rundt
Danmark Rundt
Danmark Rundt